Veronica se întoarce (Veronica Returns) is a 1973 Romanian musical film directed by Elisabeta Bostan. It is the sequel to Bostan's 1972 musical Veronica.

Cast
 Lulu Mihaescu as Veronica
 Margareta Pîslaru as Teacher / the Ant Queen / the fairy
 Dem Radulescu as Danila the Tomcat / the cook
 Angela Moldovan as Smaranda

See also
 List of Romanian films
 Cinema of Romania

References

External links
 

1973 films
Romanian fantasy films
1970s Romanian-language films
1970s musical films
Films directed by Elisabeta Bostan
Romanian children's films